Rafael Araújo Almeida (born 28 May 1989) is a Brazilian actor, director, producer, and singer-songwriter. In addition to acting in several telenovelas, he works as a director in his own video production company, RA3 Filmes. He currently lives in Orlando, Florida.

Career
He made his television debut on the soap opera Páginas da Vida, playing the pianist Luciano. Soon after, he starred in the fifteenth season of Malhação, in addition to acting on other TV series and telenovelas of Rede Globo. Almeida began his career as a director and founded the video producer RA3 Filmes where he directed video clips of great Brazilian and international music artists, as well as several advertising campaigns. Parallel to the career of actor and director; Rafael also invests in his singing career.

He released his first album as a singer in 2013 by the record company Som Livre, with music production by Rogério Vaz and had two of his songs in soundtracks of soap operas of Rede Globo. In the album "Bungee Jump", Rafael duels with the Brazilian singer Maria Gadú, in the song "Grande Angular".

In 2014 he lived in Los Angeles where he studied at the Musicians Institute, one of the largest music conservatories in the United States. Currently, he has released for "Livre Livre" an EP called "Rio California", produced by Juliano Cortuah.

Filmography

Television

Cinema

Theater

Discography

Studio albums

Extended plays (EPs)

Singles

Awards and nominations

References

External links 

Official website

1989 births
Living people
Male actors from Brasília
Brazilian male telenovela actors
Brazilian male film actors
21st-century Brazilian male singers
21st-century Brazilian singers
Brazilian male stage actors
Brazilian television presenters
Brazilian emigrants to the United States
Male actors from Florida
Som Livre artists
Musicians Institute alumni
21st-century Brazilian male actors